Myrcianthes callicoma is a species of plant in the family Myrtaceae. It is found in Argentina and Bolivia.

References

callicoma
Vulnerable plants
Taxonomy articles created by Polbot